The 1982 Los Angeles Dodgers entered the season as the defending World Series champions. They would remain in contention until the final day of the regular season, when the San Francisco Giants would knock them out of the National League West division race, in a season that saw the Atlanta Braves reach the playoffs instead. The Dodgers finished second in the National League West at 88–74, becoming the fifth team since 1969 to miss the playoffs one year after winning the World Series. This was the final season for longtime Dodger cornerstones Steve Garvey and Ron Cey, who would move on to new teams next season. The Dodgers did welcome new second baseman Steve Sax, who won the Rookie of the Year Award.

Offseason 
 December 9, 1981: Acquired Jorge Orta, Larry White and Jack Fimple from the Cleveland Indians for Rick Sutcliffe and Jack Perconte.
 December 11, 1981: Mark Belanger was signed as a free agent.
 January 6, 1982: Acquired Paul Voigt (minors) and Scotti Madison from the Minnesota Twins for Bobby Castillo and Bobby Mitchell.
 February 8, 1982: Acquired Lance Hudson (minors) from the Oakland Athletics for Davey Lopes.
 March 30, 1982: Acquired Bert Geiger and Cecil Espy from the Chicago White Sox for Rudy Law.

Regular season

Season standings

Record vs. opponents

Opening day lineup

Notable transactions 

 April 28, 1982: Acquired Jose Morales from the Baltimore Orioles for Leo Hernández
 October 15, 1982: Sold Ted Power to the Cincinnati Reds

Roster

Player stats

Batting

Starters by position 
Note: Pos = Position; G = Games played; AB = At bats; H = Hits; Avg. = Batting average; HR = Home runs; RBI = Runs batted in

Other batters 
Note: G = Games played; AB = At bats; H = Hits; Avg. = Batting average; HR = Home runs; RBI = Runs batted in

Pitching

Starting pitchers 
Note: G = Games pitched; IP = Innings pitched; W = Wins; L = Losses; ERA = Earned run average; SO = Strikeouts

Other pitchers 
Note: G = Games pitched; IP = Innings pitched; W = Wins; L = Losses; ERA = Earned run average; SO = Strikeouts

Relief pitchers 
Note: G = Games pitched; W = Wins; L = Losses; SV = Saves; ERA = Earned run average; SO = Strikeouts

Awards and honors 
1982 Major League Baseball All-Star Game
Steve Howe reserve
Dusty Baker reserve
Steve Sax reserve
Fernando Valenzuela reserve
National League Rookie of the Year
Steve Sax
Baseball Digest Rookie All-Star
Steve Sax
Silver Slugger Award
Pedro Guerrero
TSN National League All-Star
Pedro Guerrero
NL Pitcher of the Month
Steve Howe (June 1982)
NL Player of the Week
Jerry Reuss (June 14–20)
Pedro Guerrero (Aug. 23–29)
Dusty Baker (Sep. 6–12)

Farm system 

Teams in BOLD won League Championships

Major League Baseball Draft

The Dodgers drafted 32 players in the June draft and 12 in the January draft. Of those, only four players would eventually play in the Major Leagues.

The first selection in the June draft was first baseman Franklin Stubbs of Virginia Tech. He would spend 10 seasons in the Majors, including 6 with the Dodgers but only hit .232 during that span.

Notes

References 
Baseball-Reference season page
Baseball Almanac season page

External links 
1982 Los Angeles Dodgers uniform
Los Angeles Dodgers official web site

Los Angeles Dodgers seasons
Los Angeles Dodgers
Los